Act now or Act Now may refer to:

Organizations
 ActNow Theatre, a social justice focused theatre company in South Australia
 Act Now (campaign group), a human rights group in support of Tamils
 Act Now BC; See Mary McNeil
 ACT Now, a non-profit dedicated to advocating for afterschool programming in Illinois

Other uses
 Act Now (exchange program), administered by the Strømme Foundation, Norway
 Act Now (slogan), in Hong Kong
 Act Now, a campaign by Young Friends of the Earth
 Act now, a campaign by Progressio Ireland

See also
 Fish or cut bait, an English expression
 A.N.S.W.E.R. (Act Now to Stop War and End Racism), a US-based protest umbrella group
 ANHAD (Act Now for Harmony and Democracy), an Indian socio-cultural organization established in 2003
 Clear the Air (Hong Kong) "Act now – fight for better air", regarding air pollution in Hong Kong
 "We must act now", in Stern Review
 "Act now, explain later", a quotation of Jean Chrétien
 Act now, philosophy of Og Mandino
 "Act Now, Apologize Later", a quotation of Adam Werbach,  
 "Let's act now, before it's too late", a quotation of Walter Williams